It Could Happen to You is a 1994 American romantic comedy-drama film starring Nicolas Cage and Bridget Fonda. In a plot inspired by a real-life news story, a New York City police officer (Cage) who is short on cash and unable to tip his waitress (Fonda), half-jokingly offers to share his winnings if he happens to win the lottery.

Isaac Hayes is the film's narrator and also plays a supporting role as undercover reporter and photographer, Angel Dupree.

The film was remade in Hindi as Bade Dilwala, which was released in 1999 and in Telugu as Bahumati in 2007.

Plot
Police Officer Charlie Lang is a kind and generous man who loves his job and the Queens area of New York City where he lives. His wife Muriel works in a hairdressing salon and, unlike Charlie, is selfish, greedy and materialistic, constantly complaining about their situation in life. Waitress Yvonne Biasi, is bankrupt because her husband Eddie, whom she had not yet been able to afford to divorce, took her credit card and spent $12,000 without her permission.

Charlie meets Yvonne when she waits on him at the diner where she works. Since Charlie doesn't have enough money to pay the tip, he promises Yvonne to give her either double the tip or half of his prospective lottery winnings. He wins $4 million (in 21 annual payments) in the lottery the next day and keeps his promise, despite the protests of his wife. He and Yvonne become stars almost immediately.

Yvonne buys the diner she was working in. She sets up a table with Charlie's name at which people who cannot afford food can eat for free. In another development, Charlie becomes a hero for foiling an attempted robbery at a grocery store but gets wounded in the process, forcing him to take leave from the police force.

At a gathering on a chartered boat for the lottery winners and other members of high society, Muriel gets to know the newly rich Jack Gross. She flirts with him and later starts an affair. Meanwhile, Charlie and Yvonne spend a lot of time together, often giving gifts to passengers of the subway or to children, about which the media report. Muriel gets fed up with Charlie's constant donations and overall simplicity and throws him out of their apartment, asking for a divorce.

That same evening, Yvonne leaves her apartment after her husband shows up and threatens to stay until he gets $50,000 from her. Quite innocently, Charlie and Yvonne run into each other at the Plaza Hotel and, unintentionally, end up spending the night together.

When Muriel and Charlie divorce, Muriel wants all the money that Charlie won for herself. Charlie doesn't mind giving his share of the money but Muriel also wants the money he gave Yvonne, which causes Charlie to take the case to court. The jury decides in Muriel's favor. Yvonne, feeling guilty at costing Charlie all his money, storms out of court in tears and tries to keep away from Charlie. But the cop, by now hopelessly in love with the waitress, finds her at the diner and tells her that the money means nothing to him, and they declare their love for each other. While ruminating about their future at the diner, they are gracious enough to provide a hungry and poor customer some soup, which he eats at the special table. The poor customer is actually a disguised photographer, Angel Dupree, who is revealed to be the film's narrator; he takes photos of the couple and in the next day's newspapers publicly praises their willingness to share a meal and some cash with him, even in "their darkest hour". Just as Charlie and Yvonne are giving up and moving out of town, they begin receiving bags of mail from New Yorkers who read the story, sending encouraging letters containing "tips for the cop and the waitress" totaling about $600,000.

After Charlie and Muriel get divorced, Muriel's new husband Jack Gross flees the country with all her money, revealing himself to be a con man. She then moves in with her mother in The Bronx and goes back to her old manicure job. Yvonne's ex-husband Eddie ends up being a taxi driver. Charlie happily returns to the police force and Yvonne reclaims the diner. At the film's end, Charlie and Yvonne get married and begin their honeymoon by taking off from Central Park in a hot air balloon that bears the New York Post headline "Cop Weds Waitress", just before the closing credits roll.

Cast

Production
The diner where Yvonne works in the film was constructed in a parking lot at the corner of N. Moore St. and West Broadway in the Tribeca neighborhood of Manhattan. The film was called “Cop Gives Waitress Million Dollar Tip” when it was shot there.

Reception
The film received generally positive reviews from critics. Rotten Tomatoes calculates a "Fresh" rating with a score of 71% based on reviews from 35 critics.

The film grossed $37,939,757 in the United States and Canada but only $9.8 million internationally for a worldwide total of $47.7 million.

Soundtrack
The soundtrack album was released by Columbia Records/Sony Records on July 19, 1994.
 "Young at Heart" - Tony Bennett and Shawn Colvin
 "They Can't Take That Away From Me" - Billie Holiday
 "Now It Can Be Told" - Tony Bennett
 "Swingdown, Swingtown" - Wynton Marsalis
 "She's No Lady" - Lyle Lovett
 "Always" - Tony Bennett
 "Overture" - Carter Burwell
 "I Feel Lucky" - Mary Chapin Carpenter
 "Round of Blues" - Shawn Colvin
 "The Search" - Carter Burwell
 "Young at Heart" - Frank Sinatra

Real-life incident
In 1984, Phyllis Penzo was a waitress at a pizzeria commonly frequented by Yonkers, New York, police officers. In March of that year, Officer Robert Cunningham, a regular patron and longtime friend of Penzo, suggested that the two split a lottery ticket, each of them choosing three of the six numbers, in lieu of his leaving her a tip. Penzo agreed, and though she subsequently forgot about it, when Cunningham discovered that the ticket had won a $6 million prize, he honored their verbal agreement and split the money evenly with Penzo.

Beyond this basic premise, the film is entirely fictional, with the backgrounds of the film's characters and the events depicted in the film subsequent to their lottery win bearing no resemblance to the actual lives of Penzo and Cunningham. As a result, neither Penzo nor Cunningham were required to authorize the film, nor were they entitled to collect royalties from its proceeds.  The closing credits of the film include a disclaimer stating that although the film was inspired by actual events, at the time of production both Penzo and Cunningham were happily married to their respective spouses.

References

External links

American romantic comedy-drama films
Comedy films based on actual events
1990s English-language films
Films scored by Carter Burwell
Films directed by Andrew Bergman
Films set in New York City
Films shot in New Jersey
Films shot in New York City
TriStar Pictures films
1990s romantic comedy-drama films
1994 films
Films with screenplays by Jane Anderson
1994 comedy films
1994 drama films
1990s American films
Films about lotteries